Murilo Becker Da Rosa (born July 14, 1983 in Farroupilha) is a Brazilian professional basketball player.

Professional career
Becker was eligible for the 2005 NBA Draft, but he was not drafted.

During his pro club career, Becker has played with the Brazilian League club Bauru.

National team career
Becker has been a member of the senior Brazilian national basketball team. With Brazil, he played at the following tournaments: the 2003 FIBA AmeriCup, the 2005 FIBA AmeriCup, the 2006 FIBA World Cup, the 2007 FIBA AmeriCup, and the 2010 FIBA World Cup.

References

External links
 FIBA Profile
 EuroCup Profile
 NBA Draft Profile
 RealGM.com Profile
 LatinBasket.com Profile
 NBB Profile 

1983 births
Living people
2006 FIBA World Championship players
2010 FIBA World Championship players
Associação Bauru Basketball players
Basketball players at the 2011 Pan American Games
Brazilian men's basketball players
Brazilian people of German descent
Botafogo de Futebol e Regatas basketball players
Centers (basketball)
CR Vasco da Gama basketball players
Esporte Clube Vitória basketball players
Franca Basquetebol Clube players
Maccabi Tel Aviv B.C. players
Minas Tênis Clube basketball players
Novo Basquete Brasil players
Pan American Games gold medalists for Brazil
Pan American Games medalists in basketball
PBC Academic players
Sportspeople from Rio Grande do Sul
Power forwards (basketball)
São José Basketball players
Medalists at the 2003 Pan American Games
Medalists at the 2007 Pan American Games